The 1988 Cronulla-Sutherland Sharks season was the 22nd in the club's history. They competed in the NSWRL's 1988 Winfield Cup premiership and finished the regular season as minor premiers. They then came within one match of the grand final but were knocked out by the Balmain Tigers. The Sharks also competed in the 1988 Panasonic Cup.

Three Sharks players, Andrew Ettinghausen, Gavin Miller and Mark McGaw were selected to make their international debuts for Australia in 1988.

Ladder

 South Sydney were stripped of 2 competition points due to an illegal replacement in one game.

References

Cronulla-Sutherland Sharks seasons
Cronulla-Sutherland Sharks season
Cronulla-Sutherland Sharks season